Nea Charavgi is a village in the municipality of Kozani, northern Greece, located 5 km east of the center near the municipal park Kouri. The population of Nea Charavgi was 1,294 at the 2011 census. Together with the old village Charavgi (pop. 6) it forms the community Charavgi.

The public corporation of electricity moved the village to its present location between the late 1980s and middle 1990s, when the original site was found to contain deposits of lignite.

Charavgi was named Tzoumas until 1928, and Amygdala between 1928 and 1961.

References

Kozani
Populated places in Kozani (regional unit)